Horton High School is a public high school located in Wolfville Ridge, Nova Scotia, Canada. It succeeded Horton District High School (1959-1998).

As of 2022, the school principal is Jodye Routledge.  The athletic teams are the 'Griffins'. In 2015, there were approximately 867 students enrolled in grades 9–12 at the school.

The school is fully networked and offers a less than 1.9:1 student-to-computer ratio.  The school was a part of Canada's SchoolNet Network of Innovative Schools program which is no longer active.

Students

Performance
Horton High School students compete in numerous academic competitions, such as the math, computer science, and chemistry contests run by the University of Waterloo and the AMC. It has been highly ranked in standardized testing.

Extra-curricular activities

The Arts
 Art Club
 Concert Band
 Concert Choir
 Improv Club
 Horton Creative Productions
 Junior and Senior Jazz Bands
 Advanced and Beginning String Ensembles
 Glee Club
 The school's Music Department alternates between a Band Trip (To Boston and New York during March Break) and a Musical. Past musical productions include "My Fair Lady" (1997), "The Music Man" (1998), "Crazy for You" (2000), "Bye Bye Birdie" (2002), "Once on This Island" (2004), Grease" (2008), "42nd Street" (2010), "The Wiz" (2012), and "Legally Blonde" (2014).

Athletics

 Badminton
 PP contest
 Baseball
 Basketball
 Cheerleading
 Cross Country
 Curling
 Football
 Golf
 Hockey
 Rugby
 Skiing
 Snowboarding
 Soccer
 Softball
 Table Tennis
 Track and Field
 Volleyball
 Wrestling

Volleyball
Girl Division 2 won NSSAF provincial championship in 2014-2015

Basketball
Horton's boys' basketball team was nearly unbeatable for two years.  In 2008 the Horton Griffins went 41–0, capturing their 2nd consecutive provincial title. In December 2008, Horton broke the Canadian national record with their 73rd straight win. Horton has appeared in five of the last seven provincial championships.
Horton Boys and Girls Basketball won 2015-16 provincial Division 1 championship.

Soccer
The JV girls soccer team has won five provincial championships in a row from the years 2017-2021

Clubs

 Because I Am a Girl
 Best Friends for Lunch
 Environment Club
 Gender and Sexuality Alliance
 Horton Christian Fellowship
 Horton CHEF
 Horton Headstrong Committee
 Horton Tech Crew
 Hydra Debate Club
 Interact Club
 LEGO Robotics
 Math League
 Mysterious Encounters
Neurodiversity Club
 NSSSA
 Peer Tutors
 PLAYAS - Peer Leadership About Youth And Sexuality
 Prefects
 Prom Committee
 Relay for Life
 Respect for Diversity
 S.A.C. Club
 Social Justice Club
 Students Council
 Student Music Executive

Notable alumni
Peter MacKay, former Minister of JusticeAttorney General of Canada, former Minister of National Defence, former Minister of Foreign Affairs
Drake Batherson, Professional ice hockey player
Matthew Jodrey, Mineralogist and Barrister

References

External links
 Horton High School

High schools in Nova Scotia
Schools in Kings County, Nova Scotia